In the 1996–97 season, CD Tenerife failed to improve on the previous season's fifth-place finish, although they made up for the league disappointment by reaching the UEFA Cup semi-finals. Tenerife scored 69 goals in the league and could have possibly finished higher were it not for their leaky defence, which conceded more goals than all but five of the La Liga teams not relegated during the season.

At the end of the season, manager Jupp Heynckes left to join incumbent champions Real Madrid; his assistant, Ewald Lienen, also left to manage Hansa Rostock. Heynckes was replaced by Portugal manager Artur Jorge.

First-team squad
Squad at end of season

Left club during season

Transfers

Results

La Liga

League table

Results by round

Matches

UEFA Cup

First round

Second round

Third round

Quarter-final

Semi-final

Copa del Rey

Eightfinals

Statistics

Players statistics

Goal scorers

La Liga
 Juanele 8
 Meho Kodro 6
 Antonio Pinilla 7
 Oliver Neuville 5
 Aurelio Vidmar 1

See also
CD Tenerife
1996–97 La Liga
1996–97 Copa del Rey

References

CD Tenerife seasons
Tenerife